Agnes of Rheinfelden (*; † 19 December 1111) was the daughter of Rudolf of Rheinfelden, and the wife of Berthold II of Zähringen, Duke of Swabia.

Life 
Agnes was the daughter of Rudolf von Rheinfelden, duke of Swabia, and anti-king of Germany, and his wife Adelaide of Savoy. Her sisters were Bertha of Rheinfelden, countess of Kellmünz, and Adelaide of Rheinfelden, queen consort of Hungary. 
In 1079, shortly after her mother’s death. Agnes married Berthold II of Zähringen. After the deaths of her father, Rudolf, in 1080, and her sister, Adelaide, and her brother, Berthold of Rheinfelden, who both died in 1090, Agnes inherited much of the property of her natal dynasty.

Agnes was the founder of the abbey of St. Peter in the Black Forest, burial site for members of her husband’s dynasty (the Zähringer).

Agnes and her husband died within a few months of each other in 1111. They were both interred at St Peter in the Blackforest, an abbey they founded, which became the main burial place for their dynasty.

Marriage and children
Agnes had at least eight children with Berthold II, including four sons, and four (or perhaps five) daughters:
 Berthold (* c.1080)
 Rudolf II (* c.1082; † 1111), count of Rheinfelden
 Berthold III, duke of Zähringen (r.1111-1122), succeeded by his brother, Conrad I 
 Conrad I, Duke of Zähringen 
 Agnes (d. after 8 January 1125), married William II of Burgund-Besançon
 Liutgard (died young)
 Petrissa (* c.1095; d. before 1116), married Frederick I of Pfirt
 Liutgard (* c.1098; d. 25 March 1131), married Godfrey of Calw
 Judith (* c.1100), married Ulrich II of Gammertingen

References 
 Hans-Otto Mühleisen: Die Beziehung der Abtei St. Peter auf dem Schwarzwald zum Oberaargau. In: Jahrbuchvereinigung Oberaargau (Hg.): Jahrbuch des Oberaargaus, Jg. 46, Langenthal 2003, S. 97–135 (hier (PDF; 2,6 MB) im Volltext online abrufbar)
K. Schmid, ed., Die Zähringer. Schweizer Vorträge und neue Forschungen (Sigmaringen, 1990)
E. Heyck, Geschichte der Herzöge von Zähringen (Baden, 1891). 
 J. Krimm-Beumann, ‘Der Rotulus Sanpetrinus und das Selbstverständnis des Klosters St. Peter im 12. Jahrhundert.’ in: H-O. Mühleisen, H. Ott, and T. Zotz, eds., Das Kloster St. Peter (Waldkirch 2001).

Notes 

1111 deaths
Duchesses of Swabia
House of Zähringen
11th-century German women
12th-century German women
Daughters of kings